Sponsor or sponsorship may refer to a person or organization with some role (especially one of responsibility) regarding another person or organisation:
Sponsor (commercial), supporter of an event, activity, or person
Sponsor (legislative), a person who introduces a bill
Sponsor (genus), a genus of beetles
Child sponsorship, form of charitable giving
Ship sponsor
Sponsor of baptism, see godparent
Sponsorship in a twelve-step program
"Sponsor" (song), a song by Teairra Marí
Sponsor (TV series), a 2021 South Korean television series

See also
 Sponsored walks / walkathons, class of charitable fundraising/publicity activities